The Northaven Trail is a 8.2 mile hike/bike commuter and recreational trail that runs through the northern neighborhoods in Dallas, Texas.  Currently, the trail connects the neighborhoods from Central Expressway (US75) to Denton Drive and the Dallas DART station.  It provides a recreational resource for the area as well as providing east / west transportation alternatives. The trail is part of the greater Dallas Parks Department and part of the Texas Department of Transportation’s and Dallas City Council's plan to increase alternative means of transportation throughout the city.

The near future plans for the trail include the first ever pedestrian bridge over Central Expressway which will connect the Northaven Trail to the White Rock Creek Trail, SoPac Trail and Cottonwood Creek Trail on the east.

For western expansion, the aim is to connect the trail to Bachman Lake and Dallas Love Field area.

About 
The Northaven Trail is a commuter and recreational bike and hike trail built and maintained by the Dallas Parks and Recreation Department. The trail runs from Valleydale Drive (near Central Expressway) to Monroe Drive with plans to connect to the White Rock Creek Trail and Cottonwood Creek Trail on the east, and Irving’s Campion Trail on the west.

The trail consists of a 12-foot-wide concrete path for pedestrians and cyclists that runs 7.8 miles (12.6 km) through the Hillcrest Forest, Hockaday, Northaven Park, and Sparkman neighborhoods of North Dallas.

History 
The Northaven Trail started out as a 2.5 mile trail stretching from Valleydale Drive (near Central Expressway) on the east to Preston Road on the west.  Construction on the Northaven Trail began in 2010 and was completed in 2012.

The trail’s path took advantage of Oncor’s east-west power line coordinator through North Dallas neighborhoods.

The trail’s western expansion began to take shape with construction starting in 2017 and finishing in 2019. This phase extended the trail to 8.8 miles between Valleydale Drive and Monroe Drive.

Initial funding for the project came through a variety of sources, including federal, Dallas County, city, and private donations. The Friends of the Northaven Trail, a nonprofit organization, was founded in 2010 to organize public and private support for development, maintenance, and usage of the Northaven Trail.

The Northaven Trail is part of the overall Dallas Parks and Recreation’s plan to provide alternative transportation options to the residences of Dallas.

Rewilding 
The United Nations have listed re-wilding as one of several methods needed to achieve massive scale restoration of natural ecosystems, which they say must be accomplished by 2030.  As part of this activity, the Friends of Northaven Trail, along with Dallas Parks Department, annually plants native wildflowers along the trail and prevents mowing of these areas.

In the future, the trail plans to integrate stands of Blackland prairie grasses and wildflowers, with garden sections to specifically attract butterflies, pollinators, hummingbirds, and migrating songbirds, with accents and ornamental places for friends and neighbors to meet and enjoy the trail.  

The carefully curated landscape of native plants will resemble flowing slices of the original North Texas Blackland prairie, punctuated by ornamental gardens. Landscaping choices have meaningful effects on the populations of birds and the insects they need to survive. The landscape will benefit birds, pollinators and other wildlife who need these native plants to survive and thrive, and at the same time be a pleasant place for people to visit.

For more information on Rewilding and its benefits, here are some key sources of information:

"What is Rewilding" by Rewilding Institute

"What is Rewilding" by True Nature Foundation

"Why Native Plants Matter" by National Audubon Society

"Native Plants" by The National Wildlife Federation

Master plan 
In 2021, the trail will continue to expand, this time to the east.  With the first pedestrian bridge over Central Expressway, Northaven Trail will connect to the wider Dallas trail system with White Rock Creek Trail, Cottonwood Trail, and, eventually, the SoPAC Trail.  This bridge is aptly named the "Low Five" in contrast to the Dallas High Five interchange bridge connecting 75 an 635.

"Northaven Trail Pedestrian Bridge Over US 75 Will Link Disconnected Neighborhoods: An expansion over the highway will link the North Dallas trail to the White Rock Creek, Cottonwood, and SoPac trails on the east side of Central." D-Magazine

The bridge is being funded by TxDot which states "The project will join the Northaven Trail to existing trails east of US 75 and the regional trail system. The project also will stand as a regional example of the positive benefits of appropriate location and design aesthetics for future bicycle and pedestrian trails and amenities."

See also
Preston Hollow, Dallas

References

External links 
 Dallas County Trails
 Friends of the Northaven Trail
All Trails
Dallas Parks
North Texas Trails

Rail trails in Texas
Transportation in Dallas